ClearSale is a fraud management and chargeback protection services company that was founded in Brazil in 2001. It has offices in Miami, Florida in the United States and São Paulo, Brazil and over 1,000 employees. 

ClearSale works with e-commerce companies to identify fraudulent transactions. Its fraud detection software combines machine learning with human interaction. ClearSale works with major brands including Calvin Klein, Chanel, Ray-Ban, Sony, Staples, Inc. and Walmart.[2]

The ClearSale platform tracks orders submitted to its clients' websites and sorts orders based on its determined fraud risk. A manual review process is required for denied transactions to reduce false positives. ClearSale focuses on indicators of CNP fraud management such as chargeback losses, rejected orders, fraud and response time. ClearSale's platform includes end-to-end fraud management and prevention.

History
ClearSale was founded in 2001 by former Olympic athlete Pedro Chiamulera. 

In January 2008, ClearSale partnered with Quova to use Quova's internet geolocation data for ClearSale's fraud detection platform.

In 2016, 3.05% of the transactions analyzed were tried for fraud. In April 2016, Rand Internet Marketing partnered with Clearsale to make ClearSale's fraud prevention accessible to Rand's clients. That same month, ClearSale expanded with the release of its software for U.S.-based e-commerce merchants. ClearSale launched an integrated behavioral biometric function for its fraud-protection software in August 2016. It analyzes customer behavior to historical user behavior to determine the legitimacy of an order. Also in 2016, ClearSale released a map of fraud  to identify trends in fraud attempts in Brazilian e-commerce. The behavior analyses includes the time a customer spends on the website before purchasing, as short times on the website are a potential fraud indicator, along with other variables. The software processes approved orders within seconds and orders flagged for manual review can take 24 to 48 hours.

ClearSale has released integration modules for Stripe, Zoey OpenCart, Volusion, Magento, BigCommerce, Shopify, PrestaShop and WooCommerce. In October 2017, ClearSale announced the addition of fraud detection for real-time applications such as games and distance learning courses. ClearSale launched its Active Market Radar and Behavior Analytics in December 2017, which includes a fraud radar score calculation for clients.

References

External links
 Interview with founder Pedro Chiamulera
 Gartner Peer Insights

Software companies of Brazil
Software companies established in 2001
Security companies of Brazil
Brazilian brands